Battle of Peshawar, was fought on 27 November 1001 between the Ghaznavid army of Mahmud of Ghazni and the Hindu Shahi army of Jayapala, near Peshawar. Jayapala was defeated and captured, and as a result of the humiliation of the defeat, he later immolated himself in a funeral pyre. This is the first of many major battles in the expansion of the Ghaznavid Empire into the Indian subcontinent by Mahmud.

Background
In 962, Alp-Tegin, a Turkic ghulam or slave soldier, who rose to be the commander of the army in Khorasan in the service of the Samanids, seized Ghazna and set himself up as a ruler there. A successor Sabuktigin started to vigorously expand his domain, first capturing Kandahar, then began a struggle with the Hindu Shahi kingdom. The Hindu Shahi ruler Jayapala attacked Sabuktigin, but was defeated, then again later when his army of a reported size of over 100,000 was beaten. Lamghan was plundered, and Kabul and Jalalabad were annexed by the Ghaznavids. In 997, Mahmud ascended the throne at Ghazni, and vowed to invade India every year until the northern lands were his. In 1001 he arrived at Peshawar with a select group of 15,000 cavalry, and a large corps of ghazis and Afghans.

Battle
An account of the battle between the invading Turkic Ghaznavids and the Shahi kingdom was given by Al-Utbi in Tarikh Yamini. According to Al-Utbi, Mahmud pitched his tent outside the city upon reaching Peshawar. Jayapala avoided action for some time waiting for reinforcements, and Mahmud then took the decision to attack with swords, arrows, and spears. Jayapala moved his cavalry and elephants to engage his opponent, but his army was decisively defeated.

According to the sources, Jayapala, along with members of his family were captured, and valuable personal adornments were taken off the prisoners, including a necklace of great value from Jayapala. The figures of Hindu dead ranged from 5,000 to 15,000, and five hundred thousands were said to have been taken captive. Judging from the personal adornments taken off captured Hindus, Jayapala's army was not prepared for battle and thousands of children were taken captive as well.

Aftermath

Jayapala was bound and paraded, and a large ransom was paid for the release of members of his family. Jayapala felt the defeat to be a great humiliation, and later he built himself a funeral pyre, lit it, and threw himself into the fire.

Mahmud later conquered the upper Indus region, and then in 1009, defeated Jayapala's son Anandapala in a battle at Chach. He then captured Lahore and Multan, giving him control of the Punjab region.

See also
 Hindu Shahi
 Janjua
 History of Peshawar
 Pre-Ghaznavid history of Punjab
.History of India
´peshawar

References

1001 in Asia
Battles involving the Ghaznavid Empire
Conflicts in 1001
Medieval Hinduism
Medieval India
1001
Kabul Shahi